Barbie: Epic Road Trip or Barbie Epic Road Trip is a 2022 CGI-animated adventure comedy children's interactive television special directed by Conrad Helten and written by Aury Wallington which premiered on Netflix on 25 October.

The 41st and currently the latest entry in the Barbie film series, it is also the first interactive production in the Barbie media franchise. The core components of Barbie's friends and family and Barbie "Brooklyn" Roberts reprise their roles in this production.

Background
The title and the promotional artwork for this film/movie was revealed by Mattel co-president, Richard L. Dickson, while putting out a presentation for analysts and the company's board of directors on 18 February 2022, which also showcased the promotional artwork for the previous production: a television film named "Barbie: Mermaid Power". The first pre-release revelation of the film was released on 10 October 2022 through Screen Rant and The Hollywood Reporter, with the latter on the back of Mattel announcing a signature of a long-term contract extension with Netflix for more Barbie-branded productions.

Premise
"Barbie goes on a cross-country adventure/trek with friends and makes big decisions about the future. Which dream will she choose?"

Voice cast
As per the closing credits:

 America Young as Barbie "Malibu" Roberts
 Tatiana Varria as Barbie "Brooklyn" Roberts
 Kirsten Day as Skipper
 Cassandra Lee Morris as Stacie, Headless Ghost & Match Mutts
 Cassidy Naber as Chelsea
 Ritesh Rajan as Ken
 Greg Chun as George Roberts, Subway Passenger, Burro Guy
 Lisa Fuson as Margaret Roberts, Subway Conductor & Pug Owner
 Nicolas Roye as Rafa, Peanut Guy, Goat Herder & Dino Guy
 Dino Andrade as Magnifico, Old Man & Dino Fortune Teller
 Melanie Minichino as Director, Farmer Jill & Receptionist
 Channon Dade as Waitress, Stage Manager, Ticket Taker & Jacinda's Assistant 1
 Dave Fennoy as McHenry, public address system announcer & Clown
 Judy Alice Lee as Rebecca Lee & Jacinda's Assistant 2
 Alba Ponce de Leon as Jacinda

Other characters include Trey Reardon, Barbie's puppy Taffy, Ned and Ted Johnson, Bella & Ella Blue, Chuckles and Truffles.

Music
The film featured only one single titled Flip the Script, which was released on 17 October 2022 on global music streaming services. It was written by Brayden Deskins, Brandon Stewart, Nicky Egan, Khristiana Parchman and Colton Fisher, produced by The Math Club and performed by Lydia Li.

References

External links
 Barbie: Epic Road Trip on Netflix
 

English-language Netflix original films
Barbie films
2022 animated films
2022 computer-animated films
2020s Canadian films
2020s American films
2020s American animated films
American children's animated adventure films
Animated buddy films
American children's animated musical films
Canadian children's animated films
American computer-animated films
Canadian computer-animated films